Haymaking or Resting in the Fields is an 1877 painting by Jules Bastien-Lepage. First exhibited at the 1878 Paris Salon, it was acquired by the Musée du Luxembourg in 1885 at the posthumous sale of the artist's works. It passed to the Louvre in 1929 and then to its current home in the Musée d'Orsay in 1980.

References

Paintings by Jules Bastien-Lepage
1877 paintings
Paintings in the collection of the Musée d'Orsay
Farming in art